Elek Gyula Aréna in a multi-purpose indoor arena in Budapest, Hungary.  

The arena was opened in 1997 and renovated in 2016. Sports played include basketball,  handball, and volleyball.

References

External link
 

1997 establishments in Hungary
Sports venues completed in 1997
Sports venues in Budapest
Indoor arenas in Hungary
Basketball venues in Hungary 
Handball venues in Hungary 
Volleyball venues in Hungary